CKEX-FM is a radio station in Red Deer, Alberta. Owned by Harvard Media, it broadcasts an alternative rock format branded as X 100.7.

History 
CKRI-FM received approval by the CRTC on October 17, 2008, along with other new applications to serve Red Deer.

CKRI launched on August 6, 2010 as 100.7 The River, with an adult contemporary format. In August 2014,the station flipped to adult hits as 100.7 Cruz FM (modelled upon Edmonton sister station CKEA-FM). In January 2018, the station flipped to alternative rock as X100.7 (modelled upon Calgary sister station CFEX-FM). The station changed its call letters to CKEX-FM.

References

External links

 

Kri
Kri
Kri
Radio stations established in 2010
2010 establishments in Alberta